Diabougou may refer to:

Places

Senegal
Diabougou (Senegal) - a gold mining village in east Senegal near Mali
Diabougou (Thiès) - a village in west Senegal known for the "Diabougou Declaration"

Togo
 Diabougou - a village in north west Togo